Berlingeri is an Italian surname that may refer to
Cesare Berlingeri (born 1948), Italian painter
Jaime Fuster Berlingeri (1941–2007), Puerto Rican politician 
Jesús Colón Berlingeri (born 1965), Puerto Rican politician 
René Berlingeri (born 1946), Puerto Rican Olympic shooter

See also
Berlinger (disambiguation)

Italian-language surnames